The Pacific Southwest Railway Museum is a railroad museum located in Campo, California, on the San Diego & Arizona Eastern Railway line. The museum also owns and manages a railroad depot located in La Mesa, California.

Facilities

Campo
 

Since 1986, the Pacific Southwest Railway Museum operates all-volunteer train excursions from the restored 1916 Depot in Campo, in the Mountain Empire area of southeastern San Diego County, California.  These trains are powered by vintage diesel-electric locomotives. The facility sits on a  property.

The museum also has approximately 90 historic railroad cars and locomotives on display, including five steam locomotives, eighteen diesel locomotives and many other pieces of rolling stock.  A large display building houses part of the railroad equipment collection which allows visitors to view or walk through the equipment. This includes an exhibit titled "Signal Science" which uses retired railroad signals to demonstrate how railway signals work. The museum is also home to the Southwest Railway Library, which opened in Campo in July 2014.  The library contains the second largest collection of railroad history in California.

La Mesa
 

The museum manages the original La Mesa depot in downtown La Mesa, next to the La Mesa Boulevard stop on the Orange Line of the San Diego Trolley. It is the oldest building in town and is the sole surviving San Diego and Cuyamaca Railway station. The museum's renovation of the depot won an award from San Diego's historic preservation society, Save Our Heritage Organization.

Next to the depot is a display train consisting of saddletank steam locomotive 0-6-0ST Mojave Northern Railroad #3, a Pacific Fruit Express reefer car, and a Southern Pacific Railroad caboose.

In popular culture

 Part of the There Goes a... episode "There Goes a Train" features the railroad museum in Campo.  The video was made in 1994 and the museum was closed for the week of shooting.  In the video, the museum's ALCO MRS-1 United States Air Force 2104 locomotive was pulling a 3-car Golden State excursion train heading east. The museum was also a filming site for the Real Rockin' Wheels video, "Train Songs" Feature a San Diego and Arizona EMD MRS-1 1809.
 Irish girl group B*Witched filmed the music video of their hit single "Jesse Hold On" in the station in 1999, featuring one of the museum’s locomotives, Southern Pacific 2353.

See also

 Carrizo Gorge Railway
 List of heritage railroads in the United States
 List of railway museums
 List of museums in California
 Non-profit organization
 Pacific Imperial Railroad
 San Diego and Arizona Eastern Railway
 San Diego and Arizona Railway

References

External links
 Official Pacific Southwest Railway Museum website

Railroad museums in California
Heritage railroads in California
Museums in San Diego County, California
La Mesa, California